Scientists often face the question of what name or label to give to a new discovery or invention. Sometimes, an unusual name is selected.

Genes and proteins
In the early days of genomics, genes were often given creative names upon discovery. A nomenclature committee later established naming guidelines, but several early names remain.

Controversies
The trouble with unusual names has not been lost on scientists when needing to explain genetic diseases to lay-people. This has particularly been noted in patients with a defect in the sonic hedgehog gene pathway and the disease formerly named CATCH22 for "cardiac anomaly, T-cell deficit, clefting and hypocalcaemia for chromosome 22q11.2 microdeletions". This name was abandoned due to the no-win connotations.

In 1993 Alfonso Martinez Arias, a researcher at the University of Cambridge, was ordered to change the name of the gene he had discovered, VELCRO, because of copyright issues with Velcro. The gene was renamed to puckered. In 2005, Pokémon threatened to sue the discoverer of POKEMON because the name was attracting attention when its link to the development of cancer was published.

Molecules
Moronic acid, a natural triterpene
Traumatic acid, a monounsaturated dicarboxylic acid naturally occurring in plants

Species
Some species with unusual scientific names, because of length, repetition, or origin or meaning of name, include:

 Aha ha
 Anableps anableps
 Ba humbugi
 Boops boops
 Cyrtodactylus australotitiwangsaensis
 Foa fo
 Gorilla gorilla gorilla
 Griseotyrannus aurantioatrocristatus
 Ia io
 Megaloblatta longipennis
 Myxococcus llanfairpwllgwyngyllgogerychwyrndrobwllllantysiliogogogochensis
 Parastratiosphecomyia stratiosphecomyioides
 Penstemon whippleanus
 Turdus maximus

Some species with unusual biological common names include:

 A.E.E.C.L.'s sportive lemur
 Bony-eared assfish
 Happy Eddie, a species of shark
 Mountain chicken, a species of frog

Techniques
 Chromatin Interaction Analysis by Paired-End Tag Sequencing (ChIA-PET) is a technique to determine chromatin interactions which shares a name with Chia Pets.

 GluSnFR (Glutamate-sensitive fluorescent reporter ) ("glue-sniffer") is a genetically engineered protein used to monitor glutamate release into the synapse.

KINC ("Kink") is a computer program used to generate co-expression networks

 SHREC (single-molecule high-resolution colocalization) ("Shrek") is a modified labeling technique named after a titular character in the movie Shrek. Its older sister technique FIONA is still used as well.

 CRISPy TAKO (CRISPR Turbo Accelerated KnockOut) ("crispy taco") is a gene knockout technique useful for in vivo reverse genetic screens.

See also
 List of chemical compounds with unusual names

References

Biological names